Melaine Walker O.D (born 1 March 1983) is a Jamaican 400 metres hurdler. She was born in Kingston. Walker is the former Olympic 400 m hurdles champion. She held the Olympic record of 52.64, set at the 2008 Beijing Olympics, and her time of 52.42 seconds at the 2009 World Championships in Berlin was the second fastest time in history at the time and still stands as one of the top five fastest times in history.

Biography
Walker is a past student of the St. Jago High School. She won Gold at the 2008 Beijing Olympics in a new Olympic record time of 52.64 seconds. Walker won the Jamaica national championships in 54.70 seconds, narrowly beating newcomer Kaliese Spencer and qualifying for her first World Championships in Athletics.

On 20 August 2009, she set the second fastest time in history of 52.42 seconds to win the women's 400m hurdles final at the 2009 World Championships in Berlin.  She leapt on the back of the mascot Berlino the Bear to do a victory lap but Berlino crashed into a cart of hurdles and dropped her.

Achievements

Personal bests
60 metres hurdles – 8.05 s (2006, indoor)
100 metres hurdles – 12.75 s (2006) 
400 metres hurdles – 52.42 s (2009)
60 metres – 7.40 s (2005, indoor)
200 metres – 23.67 s (1998)
400 metres – 51.61 s (2008)

References

External links
 
 
 

1983 births
Living people
Sportspeople from Kingston, Jamaica
Jamaican female hurdlers
Jamaican female sprinters
Athletes (track and field) at the 2006 Commonwealth Games
Athletes (track and field) at the 2008 Summer Olympics
Athletes (track and field) at the 2012 Summer Olympics
Olympic athletes of Jamaica
Olympic gold medalists for Jamaica
World Athletics Championships medalists
Medalists at the 2008 Summer Olympics
Olympic gold medalists in athletics (track and field)
Central American and Caribbean Games silver medalists for Jamaica
Central American and Caribbean Games bronze medalists for Jamaica
Competitors at the 2006 Central American and Caribbean Games
World Athletics Championships winners
IAAF World Athletics Final winners
Central American and Caribbean Games medalists in athletics
Commonwealth Games competitors for Jamaica